CDK7 is a cyclin-dependent kinase shown to be not easily classified. CDK7 is both a CDK-activating kinase (CAK) and a component of the general transcription factor TFIIH.

Introduction
An intricate network of cyclin-dependent kinases (CDKs) are organized in a pathway to ensure that each cell accurately replicates its DNA and segregate it equally between the two daughter cells. One CDK–the CDK7 complex–cannot be so easily classified. CDK7 is both a CDK-activating kinase (CAK), which phosphorylates cell-cycle CDKs within the activation segment (T-loop), and a component of the general transcription factor TFIIH, which phosphorylates the C-terminal domain (CTD) of the largest subunit of Pol II. A proposed mode of CDK7 inhibition is the phosphorylation of cyclin H by CDK7 itself or by another kinase.

CDK7 has been observed as a prerequisite to S phase entry and mitosis. CDK7 is activated by the binding of cyclin H and its substrate specificity is altered by the binding of MAT1. The free form of the complex formed, CDK7-cycH-MAT1, operates as CDK-activating kinase (CAK). In vivo, CDK7 forms a stable complex with cyclin H and MAT1 only when its T-loop is phosphorylated on either of Ser164 or Thr170 residues.

The T-loop
In order to be active, most CDKs require not only a cyclin partner but also phosphorylation at one particular site, which corresponds to Thr161 in human CDK1, and which is located within the so-called T-loop (or activation loop) of kinase subdomain VIII. CDKl, CDK2 and CDK4 all require T-loop phosphorylation for maximum activity.

The free form of CDK7-cycH-MAT1 phosphorylates the T-loops of CDK1, CDK2, CDK4 and CDK6. For all CDK substrates of CDK7, phosphorylation by CDK7 occurs following binding of the substrate kinase to its associated cyclin. This two-step process has been observed in CDK2, where association of CDK2 with cyclin A results in a conformational change that primes the catalytic site for binding of its ATP substrate and phosphorylation by CDK7 of Thr160 in its activation segment improves the substrate protein’s ability to bind. It’s been further observed that CDK1 is not phosphorylated by CDK7 in its monomeric form and that monomeric CDK2 and CDK6 are poorly phosphorylated by CDK7, since the activation segment threonine is inaccessible to CDK7 in monomeric CDKs.

While CDK7 is indeed responsible for phosphorylation of CDK1, CDK2, CDK4 and CDK6 in vivo, it has been observed that they have varying levels of dependence on CDK7. CDK1 and CDK2 require phosphorylation by CDK7 in order to reach their active states, while CDK4 and CDK6 have been found to require consistent CDK7 activity in order to maintain their phosphorylation states. This discrepancy is likely because the phosphorylated T-loops on CDK2 and CDK1 are protected when they are bound to cyclin while the phosphorylated T-loops on CDK4 and CDK6 remain exposed and therefore are vulnerable to phosphatases. It is therefore proposed that phosphatases work to counter the phosphorylation of CDK4 and CDK6 by CDK7, creating a competition between CDK7 and phosphatases.

Dual activity
An entirely new perspective on CDK7 function was opened when CDK7 was identified as a subunit of transcription factor IIH (TFIIH) and shown to phosphorylate the carboxy-terminal domain (CTD) of RNA polymerase II (RNAPII). TFIIH is a multiprotein complex required not only for class II transcription but also for nucleotide-excision repair. Its associated CTD-kinase activity is considered important for the promoter-clearance step of transcription, but the precise structural consequences of the phosphorylation of the CTD remain the subject of debate. Cyclin H and MAT1 are also present in TFIIH, and it is not known what, if anything, distinguishes the TFIIH-associated form of CDK7 from the quantitatively predominant free form. Whether CDK7 really displays dual-substrate specificity remains to be further explored, but there is no question that the CDK7-cyclin H-MAT1 complex is able to phosphorylate both the T-loop of CDKs and the YSPTSPS (single-letter code for amino acids) repeats of the RNAPII CTD in vitro.

CDK7-cycH-MAT1 binds to TFIIH, which alters the substrate preference of CDK7. CDK7-cycH-MAT1 then preferentially phosphorylates the large subunit C-terminal domain of polymerase II instead of CDK2 when compared to the free-form complex. In addition, phosphorylation of the Thr170 residue on the T-loop of CDK7 has been found to greatly increase activity of the CDK7– cyclin H–MAT1 complex in favor of CTD phosphorylation. Phosphorylation of Thr170, then, is a proposed mechanism for regulating CTD phosphorylation when CDK7 is association with TFIIH.

The role of CDK7 in transcription was confirmed in vivo in Caenorhabditis elegans embryos. Mutants with cdk-7(ax224) were both unable to synthesize most mRNAs and had greatly reduced CTD phosphorylation as well, indicating that CDK7 is required for both transcription and CTD phosphorylation. In addition, similar results have been found in human cells. An “analog sensitive” CDK7 mutant (CDK7as) was devised which operates normally but is inhibited by an ATP analog competitive inhibitor. Inhibition of CDK7as was correlated with a reduction in CTD phosphorylation, where high inhibition led to very little instances of phosphorylated CTD-Ser5 (the phosphorylation target of CDK7 on CTD).

HIV latency
It has been demonstrated that TFIIH is a rate-limiting factor for HIV transcription in unactivated T-cells by using a combination of in vivo ChIP experiments and cell-free transcription studies. The ability of NF-κB to rapidly recruit TFIIH during HIV activation in T-cells is an unexpected discovery; however, there are several precedents in the literature of cellular genes that are activated through the recruitment of TFIIH. In an early and influential paper, demonstrated that type I activators such as Sp1 and CTF, which were able to support initiation but were unable to support efficient elongation, were also unable to bind TFIIH. By contrast, type II activators such as VP16, p53 and E2F1, which supported both initiation and elongation, were able to bind to TFIIH. In one of the most thoroughly characterized transcription systems, have studied the temporal order of recruitment of transcription factors during the activation of the major histocompatibility class II (MHC II) DRA gene by IFN-gamma. Following induction of the CIITA transcription factor by IFN-gamma, there was recruitment of both CDK7 and CDK9 causing RNAP CTD phosphorylation and elongation. Finally, Nissen and Yamamoto (2000) in their studies of the activation of the IL-8 and ICAM-1 promoters observed enhanced CDK7 recruitment and RNAP II CTD phosphorylation in response to NF-κB activation by TNF.

Stem Cells
The CDK7-cycH-MAT1 complex has been found to play a role in differentiation of embryonic stem cells. It has been observed that depletion of Cyclin H leads to differentiation of embryonic stem cells. In addition, Spt5, which leads to differentiation of stem cells upon down-regulation, is a phosphorylation target of CDK7 in vitro, suggesting a possible mechanism by which Cyclin H depletion leads to differentiation.

Role in Cancer Therapy 

Given that CDK7 is involved in two important regulation roles, it’s expected that CDK7 regulation may play a role in cancerous cells. Cells from breast cancer tumors were found to have elevated levels of CDK7 and Cyclin H when compared to normal breast cells. It was also found that the higher levels were generally found in ER-positive breast cancer. Together, these findings indicate that CDK7 therapy might make sense for some breast cancer patients. Further confirming these findings, recent research indicates that inhibition of CDK7 may be an effective therapy for HER2-positive breast cancers, even overcoming therapeutic resistance. THZ1 was used as a treatment for HER2-positive breast cancer cells and exhibited high potency for the cells regardless of their sensitivity to HER2 inhibitors. This finding was demonstrated in vivo, where inhibition of HER2 and CDK7 resulted in tumor regression in therapeutically resistant HER2+ xenograft models.

Inhibitors 

The growth suppressor p53 has been shown to interact with cyclin H both in vitro and in vivo. Addition of wild type p53 was found to heavily downregulated CAK activity, resulting in decreased phosphorylation of both CDK2 and CTD by CDK7. Mutant p53 was unable to downregulate CDK7 activity and mutant p21 had no effect on downregulation, indicating that p53 is responsible for negative regulation of CDK7.

THZ1 has recently been discovered to be an inhibitor for CDK7 that selectively forms a covalent bond with the CDK7-cycH-MAT1 complex. This selectivity stems from forming a bond at C312, which is unique to CDK7 within the CDK family. CDK12 and CDK13 could also be inhibited using THZ1 (but at higher concentrations) because they have similar structures in the region surrounding C312. It was found that treatment of 250 nM THZ1 was sufficient to inhibit global transcription and that cancer cell lines were sensitive to much lower concentrations, opening up further research into the efficacy of using THZ1 as a component of cancer therapy, as described above.

References

See also 
 Cyclin
 Cell cycle
 Wee (cell cycle)
 Cell cycle checkpoint

Cellular processes